Mansfield is a constituency created in 1885 represented in the House of Commons of the UK Parliament since 2017 by Ben Bradley of the Conservative Party, who gained the seat at the 2017 general election, from the Labour Party. This is the first time the seat has been represented by a Conservative since its creation in 1885.

The seat is centred on Mansfield in Nottinghamshire.

The seat, in recent times, has been considered a relatively marginal seat. The Mansfield council area voted with more than 70% to Leave the European Union in the 2016 referendum. In 2019, the Conservatives received 63.9% of the vote in the formerly safe Labour constituency.

Boundaries

The constituency covers the towns of Mansfield and Warsop, Nottinghamshire.

Latest boundary review
The Boundary Commission for England caused changes to constituency to allow for regional and local population changes, noticeably by moving the small town of Market Warsop from Bassetlaw into Mansfield constituency. The boundaries since the Fifth Periodic Review of Westminster constituencies (since the 2010 general election) were coterminous with the Borough of Mansfield, to have wards:
Berry Hill, Broom Hill, Cumberlands, Eakring, Forest Town East, Forest Town West, Grange Farm, Ladybrook, Leeming, Lindhurst, Oak Tree, Pleasley Hill, Portland, Priory, Ravensdale, Robin Hood, Sherwood.
Birklands and Meden were added from 2010 having previously been part of Bassetlaw constituency.

Mansfield's elected executive mayor Tony Egginton unilaterally decided to reduce the number of ward councillors (from 46 to 36) whilst simultaneously increasing the number of wards from 17 + 2 (shown above) to 36 by applying to the Boundary Commission to re-structure ward layout and boundaries from 2011:

Abbott, Berry Hill, Brick Kiln, Broom Hill, Bull Farm and Pleasley Hill, Carr Bank, Eakring, Grange Farm, Holly, Hornby, King's Walk, Kingsway, Ladybrook, Lindhurst, Ling Forest, Manor, Market Warsop, Maun Valley, Meden, Netherfield, Newgate, Newlands, Oak Tree, Oakham, Park Hall, Peafields, Penniment, Portland, Racecourse, Ransom Wood, Sandhurst, Sherwood, Warsop Carrs, Woodhouse, Woodlands, Yeoman Hill

History
The seat was created in the Redistribution of Seats Act 1885 and in the mid-19th century to the mid-20th century its economy centred on coal mining and the market town itself. Among many classes of local labourers saw organised Labour Party support, in Trade Unions, party clubs and civic society. Progression in the party's polling was heightened from the early 1920s when the seat joined many wrested from the Liberal Party, enabling the formation of the first Labour government. By length of tenure and in great majorities a safe seat status emerged for Labour (on the basis of these standard criteria) in the 1950s and 1960s.  In the 1980s general elections Labour's Mansfield candidates came closer to losing to Conservatives. At the 1983 election, Labour held the seat by just over 2,000 votes – at the following, in 1987, 56 votes. That election was set against the background of the party HQ-backed miners' strike of 1984, not supported by the majority of miners in Nottinghamshire.

In the elections after 1987 until 2017, the Labour MP Alan Meale held Mansfield with relatively large majorities. He was knighted in 2012  after receiving the award in the Queen's Birthday Honours list.

At the 2005 general election, independent candidate Stewart Rickersey, a local District Councillor, took 17% of the vote, finishing in third place.

At the 2010 general election, Andre Camilleri, another candidate from Mansfield Independent Forum and previously a local councillor with special responsibility as a Cabinet Member for Mansfield District Council during 2003 to 2007, was placed fourth with 9% of the vote, above the 5% deposit threshold.

At the 2015 general election, the UKIP candidate Sid Pepper received 25% of the vote placing him third; this dropped to 5% at the 2017 election.

At the 2019 general election, Ben Bradley held Mansfield with a 16,306 majority, the highest ever for a Conservative candidate.

Members of Parliament

Elections

Elections in the 2010s

Elections in the 2000s

Elections in the 1990s

Elections in the 1980s

Elections in the 1970s

Elections in the 1960s

Elections in the 1950s

Elections in the 1940s

Elections in the 1930s

Elections in the 1920s

Elections in the 1910s

Election results 1885–1918

Elections in the 1880s

Elections in the 1890s

Elections in the 1900s

Elections in the 1910s 

General Election 1914–15:

Another General Election was required to take place before the end of 1915. The political parties had been making preparations for an election to take place and by July 1914, the following candidates had been selected; 
Liberal: Arthur Markham
Unionist: 
Labour: 

supported by Horatio Bottomley

See also
List of parliamentary constituencies in Nottinghamshire

Notes

References

Parliamentary constituencies in Nottinghamshire
Constituencies of the Parliament of the United Kingdom established in 1885
Mansfield